Lithospermum bejariense, known by the common name western marbleseed, is a species of flowering plant in the borage family. It is native to the Southeastern United States, where it is in found rocky barrens and glades in calcareous areas. It is distinguished from other closely related Lithospermum by its flowers that are 1–2 cm long and its spreading 2–4 cm stem pubescence.

References

bejariense
Flora of the Southeastern United States
Flora without expected TNC conservation status